Acacia meiantha is a species of flowering plant in the family Fabaceae and the subgenus Phyllodineae that is endemic to a small area in eastern Australia. It was listed as Endangered in 2018 according to the Environment Protection and Biodiversity Conservation Act 1999.

Description
It has smooth greenish brown to grey or light brown coloured bark and angled hairy branchlets. Like most species of Acacia it has phyllodes rather than true leaves. 
It blooms between July and October producing yellow flowers. The simple inflorescences are found in groups of 2 to 19 in an axillary raceme. Following flowering firmly papery to thinly leathery glabrous seed pods form.

Taxonomy
The species was first formally described by the botanists Mary Tindale and C.Herscovich in 1992 as part of the work Acacia meiantha (Fabaceae, Mimosoideae), a new species from the Central Tablelands of New South Wales as published in the journal Australian Systematic Botany. It was reclassified as Racosperma meianthum by Leslie Pedley in 2003 then transferred back to genus Acacia in 2006. 
The latin specific epithet of meiantha is derived from the few flowers contained in the flower-heads. The phyllodes resemble those of Acacia linifolia and Acacia boormanii.

Distribution
It has a limited range from around Clarence and Mullions Range in the Great Dividing Range in New South Wales where it is found among dry sclerophyll forest or woodland communities growing in clay or sandy soil. The area of its range is estimated to be  consisting of severely fragmented populations that are in decline. There are three disjunct populations located on the Central Tablelands situated within  of one another.

See also
List of Acacia species

References

meiantha
Flora of New South Wales
Plants described in 1992
Taxa named by Mary Tindale